Crown Point was originally the name given to an area within the city of Norwich in England. It is most notable for Crown Point TMD.

Areas of Norwich